Frederick Michael, Count Palatine of Zweibrücken-Birkenfeld (Ribeauvillé, Alsace, 27 February 1724 – 15 August 1767 in Schwetzingen) was a member of the Wittelsbach dynasty. He was the son of Christian III of Palatinate-Zweibrücken and Caroline of Nassau-Saarbrücken and a member of the House of Palatinate-Zweibrücken-Birkenfeld, a branch of the House of Wittelsbach.  He was the father of the Bavarian King Maximilian I Joseph.

Seven Years' War
Frederick Michael was Palatine Fieldmarshal, Governor of Mannheim and finally in 1758 as Fieldmarshal of the Holy Roman Empire commander-in-chief of the Reichsarmee in the Seven Years' War against Frederick the Great.
After the Battle of Rossbach, he managed to build up the whipped imperial army again, for which he received the Grand Cross of the Military Order of Maria Theresa. In the fall of 1758 he invaded Saxony, took the fortress Sonnenstein and besieged Leipzig. The following year, Leipzig, Torgau, Wittenberg and Dresden were conquered. He secured Marshal Daun in the Battle of Maxen and fought victorious in the battle of Strehlen. 1761, he resigned from his post and handed over the imperial troops to Field Marshal Johann von Serbelloni. After the peace of Hubertusburg Friedrich Michael received the General Command in Bohemia and later became president of the secret military conference.

Family
He married Maria Franziska of Sulzbach, a granddaughter of Charles III Philip, Elector Palatine, and had five children:

 Karl II August Christian (17461795)
 Klemens August Joseph Friedrich (17491750)
 Maria Amalie Auguste (17521828), Married Frederick Augustus I, King of Saxony
 Maria Anna (17531824), Married Duke Wilhelm in Bavaria.
 Maximilian I (17561825), King of Bavaria

He also had an illegitimate son by his mistress, Louise Cheveau :

 Karl Friedrich Stephan (17671834), Baron of Schönfeld (1813), Count of Otting and Fünfstetten (1817).  His daughter Luise married August von Senarclens de Grancy.

Ancestors

References

Bibliography 
 Wilhelm Edler von Janko: Friedrich Michael (1.Art.). In: Allgemeine Deutsche Biographie (ADB). Band 7, Duncker & Humblot, Leipzig 1877, p. 627.
 Constantin von Wurzbach: Zweybrück-Birkenfeld, Friedrich Michael Pfalzgraf am Rhein. In: Biographisches Lexikon des Kaiserthums Oesterreich. Band 60. Verlag L. C. Zamarski, Wien 1891, p. 335 f.
 Richard Du Moulin Eckart: Pfalzgraf Friedrich Michael von Zweibrücken, Cotta, 1892
 Karl Theodor von Heigel: Friedrich Michael (2.Art.). In: Allgemeine Deutsche Biographie (ADB). Band 49, Duncker & Humblot, Leipzig 1904, p. 134–139.
 Artur Brabant: Das Heilige römische Reich teutscher Nation im Kampf mit Friedrich dem grossen, Paetel, 1911, p. 41 ff.
 Lebenslust und Frömmigkeit, Kurfürst Carl Theodor zwischen Barock und Aufklärung, Handbuch, 1999  y Ausstellungskatalog 

1724 births
1767 deaths
People from Ribeauvillé
House of Palatinate-Zweibrücken
House of Wittelsbach
Counts Palatine of Zweibrücken
Generals of the Holy Roman Empire
People of the Silesian Wars
Knights of the Golden Fleece of Austria
Grand Crosses of the Military Order of Maria Theresa
Burials at St. Michael's Church, Munich
Sons of monarchs
Non-inheriting heirs presumptive